Kentucky Route 57 is an  state highway in the U.S. Commonwealth of Kentucky. The western terminus is at KY 4 (New Circle Road) in eastern Lexington. The eastern terminus is at KY 8 on the banks of the Ohio River in Concord. The road runs generally southwest to northeast.

The road is two-lane for its entire length, except for a short distance near the southwestern terminus, where, as Bryan Station Road, KY 57 is four lanes wide with a center turn lane for a fraction of a mile, then two lanes plus a center turn lane for another fraction of a mile.

Major intersections

Flemingsburg business route

Kentucky Route 57 Business (KY 57 Bus.) is an  business route through Flemingsburg.

Major intersections

References

0057